John Keister may refer to:
John Keister (comedian) (born 1956), American comedian and writer
John Keister (footballer, born 1970), Sierra Leonean international footballer and coach
John Keister (footballer, born 1988), Sierra Leonean footballer currently at PK-37

See also
 Keister (disambiguation)